Lorentziella is a genus of moss in the family Gigaspermaceae.  The genus contains a single species Lorentziella imbricata known from central Texas, Mexico, and South America (Argentina, Paraguay, & Uruguay). Imbricate lorentziella moss is a common name.

References

Gigaspermales
Monotypic moss genera